Mansel Lacy (alternatively spelled Mansell Lacy) is a small village and civil parish in Herefordshire, England.

The population of the parish at the 2011 Census was 139.

The church of St Michael and All Angels dates from between the 11th and 13th centuries.

Mansel Lacy was the overall winner of Herefordshire in the 2008 Calor Village of the Year competition.

History
Mansel Lacy is mentioned in an Anglo-Saxon charter (Sawyer: 1469) from c. 1045, half a hide of which is bought as an estate.
It appears as Mælueshylle, probably meaning 'hill on which the mallow grows' from Old English malu + hyll.

The village has two entries in the Domesday Book (1086) as Malveselle in the hundred of Stepleset. It is quite small with only 11 households yet is assessed for a relatively large amount of tax of 5 geld units.

References

Villages in Herefordshire
Civil parishes in Herefordshire